The  Roserock Solar Facility is a 157 MWAC (212 MWp)  photovoltaic power station in Pecos County, Texas.  It was the largest solar project in Texas when completed in late 2016.  The facility is dispersed over about 1300 acres of land already developed for oil and gas by Apache Corporation.  It is located about a mile north of Interstate-10, and 20 miles west of Fort Stockton.

Facility details 

The project was developed by Recurrent Energy, which was acquired by the Sharp Corporation in late 2010.   Recurrent Energy was subsequently acquired by the Chinese photovoltaic panel manufacturer Canadian Solar in February 2015.  Construction on the project was financed for about $275 million and began in November 2015.  The engineering, procurement, and construction contractor was McCarthy Building Companies and the project employed about 480 workers at its peak.

The project uses approximately 700,000 CS6X-P series panels (polycrystalline, ~300 MWp each) from Canadian Solar that are mounted on single-axis trackers. It began sending electricity to the grid in late November 2016.   On November 30, 2016, Recurrent Energy sold a controlling interest in the completed facility to Southern Power.  The electricity is being sold to Austin Energy under a 20-year power purchase agreement.

Electricity production

See also
Solar power in Texas
List of photovoltaic power stations

References

External links
Solar seeks to shine through Texas hurdles
VIDEO: Constructing the Roserock solar plant

Buildings and structures in Pecos County, Texas
Photovoltaic power stations in the United States
Solar power stations in Texas
Energy infrastructure completed in 2016
2016 establishments in Texas